Flitwick Wood is a  Local Nature Reserve in Flitwick in Bedfordshire. It is owned and managed by Central Bedfordshire Council.

The site is semi-natural woodland, with some ancient trees and others that have been recently planted. It has a varied flora, including wood anemones, wood spurges and primroses, and diverse birds, bats and insects.

There is access from several roads, including Mendip Close and Tennyson Road.

References

Local Nature Reserves in Bedfordshire